The Roses of the Desert is an Italian film released in 2006. It was directed by Mario Monicelli, in his final film, and was loosely inspired by the romance Il deserto della Libia of Mario Tobino.

Plot
In World War II a group of Italian soldiers is sent to Egypt to provide assistance to the local population. The military, however, should expect other directives from the Duce Benito Mussolini but completely lose contact with the Italy. Soon the members of the brigade, which includes some very curious and picturesque characters such as the Captain who loves poetry, get acquainted with the local customs and forget their duty as soldiers. Again however the war impose its presence, after an encounter with an outspoken missionary (Michele Placido) who is walking through the desert with a troop of Germans. As hostilities begin again, the soldiers take up arms, but something has changed through their experience and they begin to consider war as useless, while they could live in blissful oblivion in a land so beautiful and rich in culture. These thoughts are cut short when the Captain, who alone had remained a reference figure for the troops, discovers that his recently deceased wife was not faithful. He commits suicide by jumping against the weapons of some Bedouin.

Cast
 Michele Placido - Brother Simeone
 Giorgio Pasotti - Lieutenant Marcello Salvi
 Alessandro Haber - Major Stefano Strucchi
 Moran Atias - Aisha
 Danilo De Summa - soldier
 Tatti Sanguineti - a general
 Fulvio Falzarano - Sergeant Barzottin
 Claudio Bigagli - soldier
 Stefano Scandaletti - soldier

References

External links
 
 Presentation of the movie The Roses of the Desert

2006 films
2000s Italian-language films
Films directed by Mario Monicelli
2000s romance films
Films with screenplays by Suso Cecchi d'Amico
Italian romance films
2000s Italian films